BEC, is a co-ed high school with students from grades 6-12 in New Waterford, Nova Scotia. It is part of the Cape Breton – Victoria Regional School Board. BEC opened in 1970 in New Waterford, NS serving 2,300 students from grades 7-12. The enrolment has dwindled for the past couple of decades as well as in other schools in surrounding areas. BEC replaced 3 other high schools in New Waterford including Central High, Mt Carmel High, and St Agnes High. There are currently 620 students at BEC, a decrease by 
30 students from the 2015 enrolment of 650. In 2016, BEC, as well as other schools in the CBVRCE added Grade 6 education to their school. Every year BEC holds their annual Coal Bowl Classic a tradition since 1981.

Academics

Departments
English Department
Fine Arts Department
Family Studies/Tec. Ed Department
French Department
Math Department
Physical  Education  Department
Science Department
Social Studies Department
Learning Strategies
Skilled Trades

See also
List of schools in Nova Scotia
Education in Canada

References

External links
Breton Education Centre website
Cape Breton-Victoria Regional School Board website

Schools in the Cape Breton Regional Municipality
High schools in Nova Scotia